A. viridis  may refer to:
 Alnus viridis, the green alder, a tree species with a wide range across the cooler parts of the Northern Hemisphere
 Amaranthus viridis, the slender or green amaranth, a cosmopolitan plant species
 Aniba viridis, a plant species found in South America
 Artamella viridis, a bird species endemic to Madagascar
 Asclepias viridis, a plant species found in North America

See also
 Viridis (disambiguation)